Pierre Tchibota (born 5 December 1968) is a Congolese footballer. He played in eleven matches for the Congo national football team from 1992 to 1997. He was also named in Congo's squad for the 1992 African Cup of Nations tournament.

References

1968 births
Living people
Republic of the Congo footballers
Republic of the Congo international footballers
1992 African Cup of Nations players
Place of birth missing (living people)
Association footballers not categorized by position